Gerald Duane Butler (January 9, 1929 – April 7, 1979) was an American politician. He served as a Democratic member in the Texas House of Representatives from 1959 to 1965.

References

1929 births
1979 deaths
Members of the Texas House of Representatives
20th-century American politicians